Okka Disk is an independent American jazz record company and label founded in Chicago by Bruno Johnson in 1994.

Okka began as a rock music label, but Johnson soon changed direction to record free jazz. Vintage Duets are the unreleased tapes recorded in 1980 by saxophonist Fred Anderson with drummer Steve McCall, and Caffeine, a trio featuring Chicago scene instigator Ken Vandermark. These were the albums that started the label. Okka Disk released many key early works by Ken Vandermark and was partly responsible for Fred Anderson's late-career renaissance.

The label also recorded European free jazz musicians such as Peter Brötzmann, documenting his transatlantic Chicago Octet and Tentet over ten albums. Since 2009, it organizes the Okka Fest, held in Milwaukee, where Johnson moved in 2002.

Releases
 OD12001 Fred Anderson/Steve McCall – Vintage Duets
 OD12002 Caffeine – Caffeine
 OD12003 Marilyn Crispell/Fred Anderson/Hamid Drake – Destiny
 OD12004 Peter Brötzmann/Hamid Drake– The Dried Rat–Dog
 OD12005 Steelwool Trio – International Front
 OD12006 Mats Gustafsson – Parrot Fish Eye
 OD12007 Fred Anderson – Birdhouse
 OD12008 Hamid Drake/Michael Zerang – Ask the Sun
 OD120010 Mats Gustafsson/Barry Guy/Paul Lovens – Mouth Eating Trees and Related Activities
 OD120012 DKV Trio – Baraka
 OD120013 Peter Brötzmann/Mahmoud Gania/Hamid Drake – The Wels Concert
 OD120014 Fred Anderson/ DKV Trio – Fred Anderson/DKV Trio
 OD120016 Joe McPhee/Ken Vandermark/Kent Kessler – A Meeting in Chicago
 OD120017 Evan Parker – Chicago Solo
 OD120018 Anthony Braxton/Georg Gräwe – Duo (Amsterdam) 1991
 OD120019 FJF – Blow Horn
 OD120022 Peter Brötzmann – The Chicago Octet/Tentet
 OD120023 Fred Anderson – Live at the Velvet Lounge
 OD120024 Georg Gräwe – Melodie und Rhythmus
 OD120025 Joe McPhee/Jeb Bishop – The Brass City
 OD120027 Joe Morris/DKV Trio – Deep Telling
 OD120028 Evan Parker/Georg Gräwe – Unity Variations
 OD120029 Jeb Bishop – Jeb Bishop Trio
 OD120030 DKV Trio – Live in Wels & Chicago, 1998
 OD120032 Peter Brötzmann Chicago Tentet – Stone/Water
 OD120033 Evan Parker/Joe McPhee – Chicago Tenor Duets
 OD120034 Loos – Armstrong
 OD120035 AALY Trio/DKV Trio – Double or Nothing
 OD120036 Joe McPhee/Hamid Drake – Emancipation Proclamation: A Real Statement of Freedom
 OD120037 School Days – Crossing Divisions
 OD120038 Kent Kessler – Bull Fiddle
 OD120039 Jeb Bishop – Afternoons
 OD120040 Territory Band 1 – Transatlantic Bridge
 OD120041 School Days – In Our Times
 OD120042 DKV Trio – Trigonometry
 OD120043 Peter Brötzmann Chicago Tentet + 2 – Broken English
 OD120044 Peter Brötzmann Chicago Tentet + 2 – Short Visit to Nowhere
 OD120045 Triage – Twenty Minute Cliff
 OD120046 Ken Vandermark – Furniture Music
 OD120047 Peter Brötzmann Chicago Tentet – Images
 OD120048 Peter Brötzmann Chicago Tentet – Signs
 OD120049 Atomic/School Days– Nuclear Assembly Hall
 OD120050 Territory Band 2 – Atlas
 OD120051 FME – Underground
 OD120052 Triage – American Mithology
 OD120053 Sonore – No One Ever Works Alone
 OD120056 Jim Baker/Steve Hunt/Brian Sandstrom/Mars Williams – Extraordinary Popular Delusions
 OD120057 Jeb Bishop/Dave Rempis/Nate McBride/Tim Daisy – The Engines
 OD120059 Peter Brötzmann Chicago Tentet – Be Music, Night
 OD120060 Territory Band 3 – Map Theory
 OD120061 FME – Cuts
 OD120062 Peter Brötzmann/Joe McPhee/Kent Kessler/Michael Zerang – GUTS
 OD120065 Ken Vandermark/Pandelis Karayorgis – Foreground Music
 OD120067 Peter Brötzmann Chicago Tentet – American Landscapes 1
 OD120068 Peter Brötzmann Chicago Tentet – American Landscapes 2
 OD120070 Territory Band 4 – Company Switch
 OD120071 FME – Montage
 OD120072 Peter Brötzmann Chicago Tentet – At Molde 2007
 OD120073 Atomic/School Days – DISTIL
 OD120075 Ken Vandermark – Collecting Fiction
 OD120076 Peter Brötzmann – Hairy Bones
 OD120077 Artifact iTi – Live in St. Johann
 OD120078 The Frame Quartet – 35 mm
 OD120079 The Engines – Wire and Brass
 OD120080 Territory Band 5 – New Horse for the White House
 OD120083 Sonore – Call Before You Dig
 OD120090 Territory Band 6 – Collide
 OD99721 Ken Vandermark Topology Nonet – Impressions of PO Music
 ODMAR001 The Margots – Pescado

Limited edition releases
 ODL10001 DKV Trio - DKV Live
 ODL10002 Günter Christmann / Mats Gustafsson - One to (Two)...
 ODL10003 Hamid Drake / Mats Gustafsson - For Don Cherry
 ODL10005 Peter Brötzmann / Hamid Drake / Kent Kessler - Live at the Empty Bottle
 ODL10006 Peter Brötzmann / Hamid Drake / Fred Hopkins - The Atlanta Concert
 ODL10007 FME - Live at the Glenn Miller Cafe
 ODL10008 Dave Rempis / Tim Daisy - Back to the Circle
 ODL10009 Paul Lytton / Ken Vandermark / Phil Wachsmann - CINC
 ODL10010 Peter Brötzmann/ Sonny Sharrock - Fragments
 ODL10011 Full Blast + Friends - Crumbling Brain

References

Notes

External links 
 Official site

American record labels
Jazz record labels
Record labels established in 1994